Staple Hill is a hill in the English county of Somerset, the highest point in the Blackdown Hills. It is classed as both a Marilyn and a Hardy.

This is one of the points on the Staple Fitzpaine Herepath a part of Forestry England woodlands.

There is a loop walk, starting from the car parking area, of 800m taking in a couple of view points with the paths upgraded early in 2009 to be suitable for disabled access.

References

Marilyns of England
Hills of Somerset